Hear The Echo (2001 – 4 April 2009) was an Irish-bred National Hunt racing horse trained by Mouse Morris and ridden by jockey Davy Russell.

In 23 starts Hear The Echo won four races, finished second once and third once, with career earnings were £164,006; his best-known win was the 2008 Irish Grand National. On 4 April 2009, Hear The Echo collapsed near the finish of the Grand National and later died.

See also
List of equine fatalities in the Grand National

References

2001 racehorse births
2009 racehorse deaths
Racehorses bred in Ireland
Racehorses trained in Ireland
National Hunt racehorses